Christian Habeck Farm, also known as the Abraham Brubaker Farm, is a historic farm and national historic district located at East Hempfield Township, Lancaster County, Pennsylvania. The district includes 12 contributing buildings.  They include the brick farmhouse, a frame Pennsylvania bank barn (1869), spring house (c. 1876), two frame tobacco barns (c. 1920), a brick tenant house (c. 1880), a summer kitchen (c. 1876), a pigsty (c. 1900), a milk house, and a creamery (c. 1910).  The farmhouse dates to the mid-to-late-19th century.  It is a 2 1/2-story, rectangular brick dwelling, with a full-width front porch.

It was listed on the National Register of Historic Places in 1994.

References

Farms on the National Register of Historic Places in Pennsylvania
Historic districts on the National Register of Historic Places in Pennsylvania
Houses completed in 1869
Houses in Lancaster County, Pennsylvania
1869 establishments in Pennsylvania
National Register of Historic Places in Lancaster County, Pennsylvania